Chennai Mofussil Bus Terminus (CMBT) (officially Puratchi Thalaivar Dr. M.G.R. Bus Terminus) is a bus terminus located in Chennai, India, providing inter-state bus transport services. It is located on the  inner-ring road (Jawaharlal Nehru Road) in Koyambedu between SAF Games Village and the Koyambedu Vegetable Market. It is the largest bus terminus in India as well as Asia. Chennai Metro Rail operates a coach depot behind the bus terminus since 2015.

History
With the growing population and transportation demand, a new terminus was planned at Koyambedu.

The terminus was planned and construction started on 6 June 1999 by M. Karunanidhi during DMK government at a cost of  103 crores and inaugurated on 18 November 2002 by J. Jayalalithaa during AIADMK government. On 9 October 2018, It has been renamed by Government of Tamil Nadu as Puratchi Thalaivar Dr. M.G.R. Bus Terminus to honor the AIADMK founder and the former Chief Minister of Tamil Nadu M. G. Ramachandran.

Service

The terminus has 6 platforms in 3 bus fingers with 180 bus bays. It also has an idle parking area for 60 buses and can station 270 buses at any given time. Being the most important entry-exit point of the city, the terminus has a capacity to handle over 2,000 buses and 200,000 passengers a day. The terminus currently handles more than 500 buses at a time, and 3,000 buses and 250,000 passengers a day. The  bus terminus has an  waiting facility for passengers, a  parking space for auto rickshaws, cabs and private cars, and  parking space for two-wheelers. The amenities provided in the terminus include 3 hotels and 3 smaller eateries inside the terminus, 3 locker rooms, 10 travel agency offices, shops, supermarkets, ATMs, dorm rooms (A/C and non-A/C) for rent, toilets, round-the-clock security, pure drinking water free of cost facilitated by a reverse-osmosis treatment plant, a 24-hour Emergency Medical Care Centre, a 24-hour Pharmacy and Free Wi-Fi internet. Wheel chairs are provided for the physically disabled. In 2012, the number of reservation counters was increased from 6 to 16.

It has been estimated that over 500,000 footfalls per day is being recorded at the terminus and over 4,800 buses, including intra-city and mofussil buses, ply in and out of the terminus.

Parking
There are provisions for parking 1,500 to 2,000 two-wheelers and 60 cars on the premises of the bus terminus. A two-level underground two-wheeler parking lot was mooted in 2008 to decongest the entrance for the buses, which jostle for space with two-wheelers and cars. Initially, the project cost was estimated at  90 million. The underground parking project was taken up based on a study that estimated that the number of motorcycles parked there would be increased to 3,000 a day in the future. Work on the 6,000-sq.m project began in January 2009 and was completed in August 2010 at a cost of  170 million. The parking facility was inaugurated on 26 December 2010, by the then Deputy Chief Minister M.K.Stalin. It has two ramps and three staircases. A fire-fighting system and surveillance cameras have been installed. The roof of the parking lot has been developed as a garden and has been provided with a sprinkler irrigation system, a pedestrian pathway, and a fountain.

In March 2013, CMDA started constructing a new two-tier basement parking facility in the terminus, adjacent to the existing lot. The new parking lot would accommodate about 2,500 vehicles, chiefly two wheelers, with a separate floor earmarked for cars.

Connections
Chennai Metro Rail has opened an elevated Metro railway station inside the bus terminus.

Other facilities

In June 2009, the Chennai City Police opened a "child-friendly centre" at the bus terminus to serve as a help booth for lost and wandering children and victims of child abuse.

There are 64 closed-circuit camera (CCTV) installed in the terminus.

Future

A 1-km long and 11-m wide flyover with three lanes in the Kaliamman Koil Street-Jawaharlal Nehru Salai junction is under consideration at an estimated cost of  500 million. The junction near Kaliamman Koil Street, which links Koyambedu with Virugambakkam, witnesses a traffic volume of 18,000 passenger car units per hour.

Satellite mofussil bus termini will be set up in Velachery and Madhavaram at a total cost of  800 million to ease traffic congestion in the city. Over 300 mofussil buses passing through East Coast Road and Rajiv Gandhi Salai, including those to Puducherry, are likely to be accommodated in the Velachery facility. Buses passing through the Grand Northern Trunk Road are likely to be accommodated in the terminus at Madhavaram. Andhra-bound buses would be operated from the Madhavaram terminus. The satellite mofussil bus termini would have facilities similar to that of the CMBT. A terminal hall, bus bays, large office space, shops, crew rest rooms and other incidental structures would be constructed. The Madhavaram terminus would cover about 8 acres and could handle 200 buses per day. The Velachery terminus, being built at a cost of  480 million, would cover about 12 acres and could handle over 300 buses a day. However, the satellite bus terminus proposal in Velachery has been put on hold in view of monorail project.

An integrated multi-storeyed parking facility with two basements and above-ground floors that will house omnibuses and idle parking for buses of various state transport corporations in a 4-acre vacant site opposite the existing omnibus terminus for private buses. The top floor of the basement will be allotted for parking of four wheelers with a maximum capacity of 400 vehicles, while the floor underneath will house a two-wheeler parking facility that would accommodate 1,000 two-wheelers. The first floor will serve as idle parking for STC buses. The omnibus terminus near the vegetable market will be shifted to the ground floor of the new parking lot.

In 2013, a multi-level parking terminal for buses and private omnibuses was proposed in an 8.75-acre plot adjoining the omnibus terminal.

See also

 Chennai Central Railway Station
 Chennai Mofussil Bus Terminus metro station
 Chennai Contract Carriage Bus Terminus
 Madhavaram Mofussil Bus Terminus
 Kilambakkam bus terminus
 Transport in Chennai

References

External links
Chennai CMBT article from The Hindu
Information on CMBT Bus Station, Facilities, Ticket booking, bus routes, Nearby Hotels, Restaurants, Malls, Cinemas theatres, Theme Parks. 

 Bus stations in Chennai